Heliophisma klugii is a species of moth of the family Noctuidae first described by Jean Baptiste Boisduval in 1833. It is found in Africa, including West Africa, Madagascar, Sierra Leone and South Africa.

References 

Catocalinae
Moths described in 1833
Owlet moths of Africa
Moths of Madagascar
Moths of Réunion